Vizhaikha may refer to the following places in Russia:

 Vizhaikha (Vishera), a tributary of the Vishera in Perm Krai
 Vizhaikha (Kolva), a tributary of the Kolva in Perm Krai
 Vizhaikha, Perm Krai, a settlement in Cherdynsky District, Perm Krai